The 2016 Mekong Club Championship is the 3rd season of the Mekong Club Championship. The championship is sponsored by Toyota and will be played between October 2016 and January 2017 featuring teams from  Cambodia, Laos, Myanmar, Thailand and Vietnam.

Qualified teams

Venues

First round
 Times listed are local (UTC+7:00) and (UTC+6:30)

Knockout stage

Bracket

Semi-final

Final
First Leg

Second Leg

Buriram United won 2–1 on aggregate.

Winners

Goalscorers

References

External links
 Official site

2016
2016 in Vietnamese football
2016 in Burmese football
2016 in Laotian football
2016 in Cambodian football
2016 in Thai football